Sergio Barrientos (born 1986), is a Colombian chess player. He was awarded the title of Grandmaster by FIDE in 2011.

Career
He won the Colombian Chess Championship in 2020 and qualified for the Chess World Cup 2021 where he was defeated by Ante Brkić in the first round.

References

External links

Sergio Barrientos chess games at 365Chess.com

1986 births
Living people
Chess grandmasters
Colombian chess players